The 1897–98 Belgian First Division was a season of the Belgian First Division, the top-level association football league in Belgium. In its third year of operation, the league was contested by five teams. F.C. Liégeois won the championship.

League standings

Results

See also
1897–98 in Belgian football

References

External links
Belgian clubs history

1897
1897–98 in European association football leagues
1897–98 in Belgian football